Loose Ends may refer to:

Music 
 Loose Ends, an RJD2 album
 Loose Ends, a 1974 album by Jimi Hendrix
 Loose Ends, a 2008 EP by Rachael Yamagata
 Loose Ends, a British R&B band
 "Loose Ends", a song by Bruce Springsteen from Tracks
 "Loose Ends", a song by Imogen Heap from Speak for Yourself
 Loose Ends, a music production company founded by Pete Waterman

Other media 
 Loose Ends , a British radio program
 "Loose Ends", an episode of Burn Notice
 "Loose Ends", an episode of Justified
 Loose Ends, a 2001 novel based on the television series Roswell
 Loose Ends, a novella by Paul Levinson
 Loose Ends, a 1930 film starring Owen Nares
 Loose Ends, a play by Michael Weller
 Loose Ends, a mission in Call of Duty: Modern Warfare 2

Other uses
Plot hole, an inconsistency in a storyline that goes against the flow of logic